The 2020 Salvadoran political crisis, commonly referred to as the numeronym 9F, was an incident in El Salvador on 9 February 2020. During the political crisis, Salvadoran President Nayib Bukele sent 40 soldiers of the Salvadoran Army into the Legislative Assembly building in an effort to coerce politicians to approve a loan request of 109 million dollars from the United States for Bukele's security plan for the country. 

The event has been condemned by foreign governments, the political opposition, and human rights organizations and is considered the first major political crisis in the country since the conclusion of the Salvadoran Civil War in 1992 and has been referred to as a coup attempt.

Background 

In early 2020, Salvadoran President Nayib Bukele wanted to secure a loan of 109 million dollars from the United States for law enforcement funding in the Territorial Control Plan. The plan sought to increase funding for the National Civil Police and reduce street crime by violently confronting gangs. His plan was met by resistance from opposition parties, notably the right-wing Nationalist Republican Alliance (ARENA) and the left-wing Farabundo Martí National Liberation Front (FMLN), as his previous policies regarding law enforcement witnessed an increased militarization of police forces. 

Neither the political party Bukele ran under during the 2019 election, the center-right Grand Alliance for National Unity (GANA), and his newly formed center-right political party, Nuevas Ideas (NI), held a majority in the Legislative Assembly which was held by ARENA and the FMLN. During his campaign, he swore he would crack down on gang violence and corruption. The two parties refused to approve Bukele's loan request as they demanded greater transparency regarding where the funds would be allocated, which Bukele refused to accept. Negotiations broke down leading to an effective gridlock in the Legislative Assembly by the end of January 2020.

Crisis 

On 6 February, Bukele invoked article 167 of the Constitution of El Salvador, calling on the Council of Ministers to convene in the Legislative Assembly on 9 February to convene a vote on the loan. The article itself provides for the convening of extraordinary session of the Council of Ministers of the Legislative Assembly in cases of national emergency. Less than half of the Legislative Assembly's voting members attended the session. Hours before the meeting in the Legislative Assembly was due to occur, Bukele met with fifty top military officials and discussed sending soldiers into the Legislative Assembly during the meeting. The military officers already been aware that Bukele had intended to do so since the day prior.

On 9 February, Bukele entered the Blue Room, the room where the Legislative Assembly met, by force accompanied by 40 military personnel and sat in the chair of Assembly President Mario Ponce. He spoke saying, "It's clear who's in control of the situation and we're going to put the decision in the hands of God," and he began to pray. After a few minutes, he exited the building and addressed a crowd of supporters stating that God urged him to be patient. He further stated, "We're going to give these scoundrels a week and if they haven't approved the plan by then, we convene them again," in reference to the politicians he needed to approve the loan request.

Aftermath and domestic reactions 

Small demonstrations protesting Bukele's military action were reported, mainly grouped at the University of El Salvador in San Salvador. In contrast, many Salvadorans spoke out on social media in support of Bukele, praising him for his hard stance on crime and gang violence. On 16 February, a crowd of supporters protested outside the Legislative Assembly demanding the approval of the loan.

The day after the incident, lawmakers condemned Bukele's action. Ponce stated "We cannot respond to the executive branch with a gun to our head" and called the incident an attempted coup. When met with accusations of staging a coup and acting with dictatorial powers, he stated: "If I was a dictator, I would have taken control of everything." The government claims that around 50,000 supporters were present, while local media outlets place the figure at 5,000. That day, no murders were reported in the country and Bukele cited that as evidence that his policies were effective. Bukele later Tweeted: "If the deputies do not attend they will be breaking with the constitutional order and the people will have the power to apply Article 87 of the Constitution." Article 87 allows the people to begin an insurrection to restore constitutional order in the country.

ARENA and the FMLN denounced the incident as a self-coup attempt, where a national leader or group illegally seizes more control than allowed by laws or a constitution, and called for the Organization of American States to intervene. Leonardo Bonilla, then the only independent deputy of the Legislative Assembly, stated, "So they’re going to make us vote with a rifle to the head? ... This isn’t the way a democracy works." Felissa Cristales, a politician from the Nationalist Republican Alliance, stated that "No Salvadoran can be in favor of this; El Salvador is a country where democracy has cost blood." FMLN leadership accused Mauricio Arriaza Chicas, the Police Chief of El Salvador, of ordering soldiers and officers to harass politicians and their families. The FMLN also stated that it would seek to hold an inquiry with René Merino Monroy, the Minister of National Defense, and Rogelio Eduardo Rivas Polanco, the Minister of Justice and Public Security, in regards to the events of 9 February. On 21 August 2020, Merino Monroy was summoned to the Legislative Assembly and asked who ordered the military to be mobilized in the Legislative Assembly, but Merino Monroy refused to answer. Félix Ulloa, the Vice President of El Salvador, stated in an interview with Jorge Ramos in March 2021 that the entry of soldiers into the legislature was a "mistake" and that it was not necessary.

The Supreme Court of El Salvador prohibited the President from calling the Legislative Assembly and also prohibited all public forces, including the Ministry of Defense, from exercising functions other than those allowed by the Constitution. Bukele expressed dissatisfaction with the order and stated that "the system protects itself," but abided by the Supreme Court's order.

On 24 February, Monsignor José Luis Escobar Alas, President of the Episcopal Conference of El Salvador and the Archbishop of San Salvador, asked people to "lower the tone of mutual attacks, or one for the other, because in this way we cannot move forward, because in the end the one that is affected is the people to avoid a new conflict," in reference to the Salvadoran Civil War.

International reactions 

A spokesperson for the United States Department of State stated that Bukele's actions were "unacceptable" and "violates the separation of powers of the democratic institutions of that country." The United States Ambassador to El Salvador, Ronald D. Johnson, denounced Bukele's actions but supported his calls for patience.

Erika Guevara Rosas, the Director for the Americas of Amnesty International, condemned the military and the police and raised concerns of what the event could mean for the future of human rights in the country. Birgit Gerstenberg, the resident coordinator of the United Nations System in El Salvador, stated that "El Salvador has made important achievements and has been deepening its democracy and the rule of law through respect for different opinions and dialogue as way to reach agreements that benefit the whole country; We trust that the spirit of dialogue will always prevail."

Legacy 

The crisis has been cited as an instance of democratic backsliding by several organizations and political scientists which state that it endangered the future of democracy in El Salvador. Both the Nationalist Republican Alliance and the Farabundo Martí National Liberation Front subsequently compared the entry of the soldiers to the legislative to the storming of the United States Capitol in January 2021. The Grand Alliance for National Unity has stated that there is no valid comparison between the attack on the United States Capitol and the entry of soldiers to the Legislative Assembly. Bukele sending the soldiers to the Legislative Assembly, together with his later actions during the COVID-19 pandemic in El Salvador, have led many of his opponents to call him authoritarian and a dictator.

Several sources and politicians have called the incident a coup or self coup attempt. Prior to 9F, the last successful coup d'état in Salvadoran history was the 15 October 1979 coup d'état which overthrew President Carlos Humberto Romero and began the Salvadoran Civil War.

See also 

 2021 Salvadoran political crisis
 List of attacks on legislatures

References

Further reading
El Bukelazo: Shades of Dictatorship in El Salvador
El Salvador President Nayib Bukele is Flirting with Fascism
El Salvador's Attempted Coup
El Salvador's President Sent Troops to Occupy the Legislature. Here's What's Going On
Is President Bukele a Reformer or an Autocrat?
 Photos: It's Been 3 Years since the Militarization of the Legislative Assembly's Blue Room
Political Crisis in El Salvador Should be Solved Through Dialogue, Not Through Power Plays and Military Deployments

Political crisis
Salvadoran political crisis
Salvadoran political crisis
El Salvador
Political history of El Salvador
Nayib Bukele